Kyaukme District is a district of northern Shan State in Burma (Myanmar). , it consisted of 9 towns and 1946 villages.

Administrative divisions
, Kyaukme District contained the following townships:
 Hsipaw Township
 Kyaukme Township
 Namtu Township
 Nawnghkio Township

Prior to August 2010, Kyaukme District also included Mantong Township and Namhsan Township, which both were transferred that month to the newly created Pa Laung Self-Administered Zone.

Kyaukme District also consisted of the following townships, which formed to become Mongmit District:

 Mabein Township
 Mongmit Township

References

Districts of Myanmar
Geography of Shan State